HNLMS Abraham Crijnssen (F816) was a frigate of the . The ship was in service with the Royal Netherlands Navy from 1983 to 1997. The frigate was named after Dutch naval hero Abraham Crijnssen. The ship's radio call sign was "PAVX".

Dutch service history
HNLMS Abraham Crijnssen was built at KM de Schelde in Vlissingen. The keel laying took place on 25 October 1978 and the launching on 16 May 1981. The ship was put into service on 6 January 1983.

Abraham Crijnssen served as escort for the British aircraft carrier  during UNPROFOR in the Adriatic Sea in May 1993.

In June 1994 the ship participated in the BALTOPS 94 naval exercise with vessels from several other navies.

In 1997 the vessel was decommissioned and was sold to the United Arab Emirates Navy.

United Arab Emirates service history
The ship was commissioned on 31 October 1997 to the United Arab Emirates Navy where the ship was renamed Abu Dhabi and decommissioned in 2008. Construction work started in 2009 to rebuild the ship into a yacht.

Notes

Kortenaer-class frigates
1981 ships
Ships built in Vlissingen